Hatkanangale Assembly constituency is one of the 288 Vidhan Sabha (legislative assembly) constituencies of Maharashtra state, western India. This constituency is located in Kolhapur district.

Geographical scope
The constituency comprises revenue circles  Vathar tarfe, Vadgaon, Vadgaon Kasba, Hatkanangle, Herle, Rui, Hupari, and Vadgaon Kasba Municipal Council in Hatkanangle taluka.

Representatives
 1962: Keshav Narsinga Ghatage, Indian National Congress
 1967: B. B. Khanjire, Indian National Congress
 1972: B. B. Khanjire, Indian National Congress
 1978: Patil Shivagonda Pirgonda, CPM	
 1980: Awade Kallappa Baburao, INC(U)	
 1985: Awade Prakash Kallappa, Indian National Congress
 1990: K. L. Malabade, CPM	
 1995: Awade Prakash Kallappa, Indian National Congress
 1999: Awade Prakash Kallappa, Indian National Congress
 2004: Awale Rajiv Kisanrao Jansururajya party
 2009: Sujit Minchekar, Shiv Sena. 
 2014: Sujit Minchekar, Shiv Sena. 
2019: Raju Awale, Indian National Congress

References

Assembly constituencies of Kolhapur district
Assembly constituencies of Maharashtra